Lucky Peak State Park is a public recreation area covering a total of  on and near Lucky Peak Lake approximately  east of Boise in Ada County, Idaho. The state park has three units: Discovery Park off State Highway 21, a roadside park for picnicking and fishing in the Boise River; Sandy Point at the base of the Lucky Peak Dam, with sandy beach and calm waters for wading and swimming; and the Spring Shores unit with boat ramps and marina at the northern end of the lake. The park was created in 1956 by agreement with the United States Army Corps of Engineers, following completion of the Lucky Peak Dam. The park is also home to the Lucky Peak Dam Zeolite Occurrence.

See also

 List of Idaho state parks
 National Parks in Idaho

References

External links

Lucky Peak State Park Idaho Parks and Recreation
Lucky Peak State Park Location Map Idaho Parks and Recreation

State parks of Idaho
Protected areas established in 1956
Protected areas of Ada County, Idaho
1956 establishments in Idaho